Western Washington is a region of the United States defined as the area of Washington state west of the Cascade Mountains. This region is home to the state's largest city, Seattle, the state capital, Olympia, and most of the state's residents. The climate is generally far more damp and temperate than that of Eastern Washington.

Climate

Western Washington is known as having a far wetter climate than the eastern portion of the state, primarily due to the effects of the Cascades rain shadow. The average location in Eastern Washington only receives an average of 46.87 centimeters (18.45 inches) of precipitation per year,  whereas the average place in Western Washington receives 167.72 centimeters (66.03 inches). The average location in Western Washington gets 168 days of measurable precipitation per year.

The place that receives the most recorded precipitation is Lake Quinault on the Olympic Peninsula, with an average of 332.92 centimeters (131.07 inches) per year. The Long Beach Experimental Station has the most days of measurable precipitation, averaging 215 each year.

Population
As of the 2020 census, Western Washington was home to 6,037,688 of the state's total 7,705,281 residents, making its population comparable to that of Missouri.

Counties
Counties in Western Washington:

 Clallam
 Clark
 Cowlitz
 Grays Harbor
 Island
 Jefferson
 King
 Kitsap
 Lewis
 Mason
 Pacific
 Pierce
 San Juan
 Skagit
 Skamania
 Snohomish
 Thurston
 Wahkiakum
 Whatcom

Cities of note
Major cities in Western Washington:

Aberdeen
Auburn 
Bellevue
Bellingham
Bremerton
Everett
Edmonds
Federal Way
Kelso
Lake Stevens
Longview
Lynnwood
Mount Vernon
Olympia
Port Angeles
Port Townsend
Puyallup
Renton
Seattle
Shelton
Tacoma
Vancouver

References 

 
Regions of Washington (state)